Philibert-Joseph Le Roux (? – before 1735 Brussels) was an 18th-century French lexicographer.

Le Roux is remembered for his Dictionaire comique, satyrique, critique, burlesque, libre & proverbial published in 1718. Le Roux was forced to leave France in 1693 after he published a pamphlet against François de la Chaise. He fled to Brussels where he died before 1735 while serving Marie-Elisabeth of Austria.

Works 
Histoire du père La Chaize, jésuite et confesseur du roi Louis XIV où l'on verra les intrigues secrettes qu'il a eues à la cour de France et dans toutes les cours de l'Europe pour l'avancement des grands desseins du roi son maître, Köln 1693; 
Dictionaire comique, satyrique, critique, burlesque, libre et proverbial, Amsterdam 1718 (540 pages), Lyon 1735 (668 pages), 1739, Amsterdam 1750, Lyon 1752, 2 Bde., Pampelune 1786 (612 + 606 pages, Paris 1793; suspected editor: François Lacombe), Amsterdam 1787. The Nouveau dictionnaire proverbial, satirique et burlesque, plus complet que ceux qui ont paru jusqu'a ce jour, a l'usage de tout le monde by Antoine Caillot (Paris 1826, 1829) was little more than a copy of Le Roux's dictionary.
Les annales du monde ou l'histoire universelle sacrée, ecclésiastique & profane, completed by chevalier Lenglet de Percel, Brüssel 1732–1735

Bibliography 
Franz Josef Hausmann, 120. Das Wörterbuch der Sprechsprache, des Argot und des Slang, in: Wörterbücher. Dictionaries. Dictionnaires. Ein internationales Handbuch zur Lexikographie. Zweiter Teilband, hrsg. von Franz Josef Hausmann, Oskar Reichmann, Herbert Ernst Wiegand und Ladislav Zgusta, Berlin. New York 1990, (p. 1184–1190)
Laurent Bray, Essai de filiation d’un dictionnaire de français non conventionnel du 18e siècle: Le Roux (1718, 1735), in: Grammaire des fautes et français non conventionnels, Paris 1992, (p. 185–196)

Notes and references 

French lexicographers